In geometry, an omnitruncation of a convex polytope is a simple polytope of the same dimension, having a vertex for each flag of the original polytope and a facet for each face of any dimension of the original polytope. Omnitruncation is the dual operation to barycentric subdivision. Because the barycentric subdivision of any polytope can be realized as another polytope, the same is true for the omnitruncation of any polytope.

When omnitruncation is applied to a regular polytope (or honeycomb) it can be described geometrically as a Wythoff construction that creates a maximum number of facets. It is represented in a Coxeter–Dynkin diagram with all nodes ringed.

It is a shortcut term which has a different meaning in progressively-higher-dimensional polytopes:

 Uniform polytope truncation operators
 For regular polygons: An ordinary truncation, .
 Coxeter-Dynkin diagram 
 For uniform polyhedra (3-polytopes): A cantitruncation, . (Application of both cantellation and truncation operations)
 Coxeter-Dynkin diagram: 
 For uniform polychora: A runcicantitruncation, . (Application of runcination, cantellation, and truncation operations)
 For uniform polytera (5-polytopes): A steriruncicantitruncation, t0,1,2,3,4{p,q,r,s}. . (Application of sterication, runcination, cantellation, and truncation operations)
 For uniform n-polytopes: .

See also 
 Expansion (geometry)
 Omnitruncated polyhedron

References

Further reading
 Coxeter, H.S.M. Regular Polytopes, (3rd edition, 1973), Dover edition,  (pp. 145–154 Chapter 8: Truncation, p 210 Expansion)
 Norman Johnson Uniform Polytopes, Manuscript (1991)
 N.W. Johnson: The Theory of Uniform Polytopes and Honeycombs, Ph.D. Dissertation, University of Toronto, 1966

External links 
 

Polyhedra
 
Uniform polyhedra